English Chileans (Spanish: Anglochilenos) are citizens of Chile who are descended from English people who have emigrated. They are estimated to number 550,000-820,000 (5%-6% of the national population).

Since the Port of Valparaíso opened its coasts to free trade in 1811, the English began to congregate in Valparaíso. The first to arrive brought with them tools, articles of china, wool and cotton, with instructions to return with copper and hemp. This was the first exchange of what would become a deep-rooted commercial relationship between the UK and Chile.

In Valparaíso they constructed their largest and most important colony, bringing with them neighborhoods of English character, schools, social, sports clubs, business organizations and periodicals. This influence is apparent in unique areas of Chilean society today, such as the bank and the national marina, as well as in certain social activities popular in the country, such as football, horse racing, and  drinking tea.

The English eventually numbered more than 32,000 during the port of Valparaíso's boom period during the saltpeter bonanza at the end of the 19th and beginning of the 20th centuries. The British colonial influence is important to understanding the boom and bust of the port of Valparaíso.

The English colony was also important in the northern zone of the country during the saltpeter boom, in the ports of Iquique and Pisagua. The King of Saltpeter, John Thomas North, was the principal backer of nitrate mining. The English legacy was reflected in the streets of the historic district of the city of Iquique, with the foundation of various institutions, such as the Club Hípico (Racing Club). Nevertheless, said presence came to an end with the saltpeter crisis during the 1930s.

An important contingent of English immigrants also settled in the present-day region of Magallanes. In the same way, they established English families in other areas of the country, such as Santiago, Coquimbo, the Araucanía, and Chiloé.

Notable people

 John Williams Wilson
 Robert Winthrop Simpson
 Ignacio Walker
 Patricio Aylwin, former President of Chile
 Francisco Hudson
 Juan Pablo Bennett
 Julio Canessa Roberts
 Joaquín Edwards Bello
 Agustín Edwards Mac Clure
 Jorge Edwards
 Alejandro Foxley
 Dominique Gallego Williams 
 Laurence Golborne
 Marmaduke Grove
 Luis Eduardo Hicks
 Stewart Iglehart
 Gustavo Leigh
 Bernardo Leighton
 Ofelia Martner
 Ana Reeves
 Felipe Seymour
 Robert Winthrop Simpson
 Robert Souper Howard
 Roberto Souper
 María Elena Swett
 Sussan Taunton Thomas
 Willy Topp
 Carlos Villanueva Roland
 Juan Williams
 Alexander Bryan Witt
 Andrés Wood

Australian prime minister Chris Watson was born in Valparaíso to British and German-Chilean parents.

See also

British Chilean

References

European Chilean